MSV Pampow is a German sports club in Mecklenburg-Vorpommern, Germany. The club was officially formed in 1990.

History 

The club's background dates back to the 1950s as BSG Traktor Pampow. BSG Traktor Pampow mostly competed in the 5th level of the DDR-Oberliga, which was the 1.Kreisklasse and sometimes had dropped down to the 6th level in the 2.Kreisklasse. MSV Pampow was officially formed on June 22, 1990 after German reunification. The club offers other sports such as volleyball, badminton and bowling. The team's nickname is "Piraten" or "Pirates". 

On the football field, the team was promoted to the Verbandsliga Mecklenburg-Vorpommern in 2010 then came in 3rd and 4th in 2012 and 2014. The team reached the finals of the  2017 Mecklenburg-Vorpommern Cup, but were defeated by FC Hansa Rostock, 3-1. The team finished in 3rd place again in 2017 then won the Verbandsliga Mecklenburg-Vorpommern in 2018. This promoted them to the NOFV-Oberliga Nord, where they compete as of January 2023.

Honors 
Verbandsliga Mecklenburg-Vorpommern
Champions: 2018

In popular culture 
MSV Pampow has been featured in the video game series, Football Manager.

References

External links 
Official Website
Official Instagram

1990 establishments in Germany
Association football clubs established in 1990
Football clubs in Mecklenburg-Western Pomerania
Football clubs in Germany